The 1977–78 WCHL season was the 12th season for the Western Canada Hockey League. Twelve teams completed a 72-game season.  The New Westminster Bruins won their fourth consecutive President's Cup and second consecutive Memorial Cup.

League notes
The Calgary Centennials relocated to Billings, Montana to become the Billings Bighorns.
The Winnipeg Monarchs relocated to Calgary, Alberta to become the Calgary Wranglers.
The Kamloops Chiefs relocated to Seattle, Washington to become the Seattle Breakers.

Regular season

Final standings

Scoring leaders
Note: GP = Games played; G = Goals; A = Assists; Pts = Points; PIM = Penalties in minutes

1978 WCHL Playoffs

Division Semi-finals
Round Robin format

Flin Flon (4–4) advanced
Regina (4–4) advanced
Brandon (4–4) eliminated
Billings (6–2) advanced
Medicine Hat (3–5) advanced
Lethbridge (3–5) eliminated
New Westminster (7–1) advanced
Victoria (4–4) advanced
Portland (1–7) eliminated

Division Finals
Flin Flon defeated Regina 4 games to 1
Billings defeated Medicine Hat 4 games to 0
New Westminster defeated Victoria 4 games to 1

League semi-finals
Round Robin format

Billings (3–1) advanced
New Westminster (3–1) advanced
Flin Flon (0–4) eliminated

WHL Championship
New Westminster defeated Billings 4 games to 0

All-Star game

On January 18, the West All-Stars defeated the East All-Stars 2–1 at Regina, Saskatchewan with a crowd of 2,814.

WHL awards

All-Star Teams

See also
1978 Memorial Cup
1978 NHL Entry Draft
1977 in sports
1978 in sports

References
whl.ca
 2005–06 WHL Guide

Western Hockey League seasons
WCHL
WCHL